Sphegina (Asiosphegina) amplistylus is a species of hoverfly in the family Syrphidae found in the Philippines. It's similar to S. inflata, S. philippina, and S. spathigera.

Etymology
The name comes from Latin ‘amplistylus’, meaning ‘large stylus’, referring to the enlarged left-side surstylus.

Description
In male specimens, the body length is 6.4 millimeters and wing length is 5.3 millimeters. The face is concave with a very weakly developed frontal prominence. The face is black, ventral half dark yellow to brown; gena and mouth edge dark yellow to brown, with large subtriangular non-pollinose shiny area; occiput black; antenna brown with black setae dorsally on scape and pedicel; thorax black; postpronotum dark brown; pleuron entirely grey; scutellum black, short, and widely sub-triangular; pro-  and mesoleg yellow, tarsomeres 4–5 black; metaleg with coxa black and trochanter yellow; femur black with basal ⅓ yellow, rather strongly incrassate; tibia black and yellow biannulate, with large rounded apicoventral dens; tarsus entirely black, basal tarsomere thick. The basal flagellomere is rectangular, the arista long and pilose, nearly three times as long as the basal flagellomere. The cerci are unmodified, roundish; surstyli asymmetrical with the dorsal lobe of left surstylus strongly inflated; superior lobe slightly asymmetrical, with several sublobes of which the anteroventral one is very long. No female specimens are known.

References

Eristalinae
Insects described in 2018
Diptera of Asia